Troy Dwan Johnson (born October 20, 1962) is a former American football wide receiver in the National Football League who played for the St. Louis Cardinals, Pittsburgh Steelers and Detroit Lions. He played college football for the Southeastern Louisiana Lions and Southern Jaguars. He also played in the USFL for the Denver Gold, Canadian Football League for the Winnipeg Blue Bombers and the Arena Football League for the Connecticut Coyotes.

References

1962 births
Living people
American football wide receivers
Canadian football wide receivers
St. Louis Cardinals (football) players
Pittsburgh Steelers players
Detroit Lions players
Denver Gold players
Winnipeg Blue Bombers players
Connecticut Coyotes players
Southeastern Louisiana Lions football players
Southern Jaguars football players
National Football League replacement players